The Cali Open is a professional tennis tournament played on clay courts. It is currently part of the Association of Tennis Professionals (ATP) Challenger Tour. It is held in Cali, Colombia, with the first edition played in 2022. The tournament originated as a quick replacement for the 2022 edition of the Quito Challenger, which was moved due to political unrest in Quito.

Past finals

Singles

Doubles

References

ATP Challenger Tour
Clay court tennis tournaments
Tennis tournaments in Colombia